Anad Abid Tweresh (born 3 August 1955) is an Iraqi football forward who played for Iraq in the 1986 FIFA World Cup.

Honours

Club
Al-Zawraa
Iraqi Premier League: 
Winner: 1982–83
Al-Rasheed
Arab Club Champions Cup: 
Winner: 1985

References

External links
FIFA profile

1955 births
Iraqi footballers
Iraq international footballers
Association football forwards
1986 FIFA World Cup players
Living people